The 2020 Colorado wildfire season was a series of significant wildfires that burned throughout the U.S. state of Colorado as part of the 2020 Western United States wildfire season. With a total of  burned, it is Colorado's largest wildfire season on record.

During this season, the Cameron Peak Fire burned 208,913 acres, making it the largest wildfire recorded in the state of Colorado after it surpassed the Pine Gulch Fire, which earned the title seven weeks prior. Also surpassing the Pine Gulch Fire in size was the East Troublesome Fire, which, when fully contained on November 30, had burned a total of 193,812 acres. In total, the suppression costs for the fires during the 2020 season amounted to at least $266 million (2020 USD).

List of wildfires 

See also 
 2020 Western United States wildfire season
 Colorado State Forest Service
 List of Colorado wildfires
 Wildfires in the United States

References

External links 
 Colorado wildfire information & resources, Colorado Tourism Office
 Hazard Mapping System: Fire and Smoke, Fort Collins Coloradoan

2020 Colorado wildfires
Wildfires in Colorado